Podštirovnik is a village in the municipality of Trebinje, Republika Srpska, Bosnia and Herzegovina. It is the southernmost point of the country.

References

Villages in Republika Srpska
Populated places in Trebinje